Patolandia nuclear is a 1978 Argentine comedy film directed by Julio Saraceni.

Cast
Rafael Carret
Luis Medina Castro
Peggy Sol
Tito Gómez
Horacio Bruno
Juan Díaz
Alfredo Barbieri
Jorge Godoy
Javier Díaz
Fabián Di Donato

References

External links
 

1978 films
1970s Spanish-language films
Films directed by Julio Saraceni
1978 comedy films
Argentine comedy films
1970s Argentine films